Hinchinbrook is an electoral district of the Legislative Assembly in the Australian state of Queensland. It is currently represented by Nick Dametto, of Katter's Australian Party.

Geography
Originally primarily a rural electorate, the district in its present form is a narrow coastal strip running from just south of Tully to the northern fringes of Townsville. Prior to the 2017 redistribution Hinchinbrook had spanned just south of Innisfail and included the towns of Mission Beach and Tully. Hinchinbrook now includes the towns of Cardwell, Ingham, Lucinda and includes the Northern Beaches suburbs of Townsville such as Bushland Beach.

Political history
The electorate was first contested in 1950 and was held by the National Party and its successor, the Liberal National Party, for over half a century. However, even as the LNP won a landslide victory in 2012, its hold on Hinchinbrook became rather tenuous amid the rise of Katter's Australian Party, with longtime MP Andrew Cripps suffering an 11 percent swing. At the 2017 state election, Nick Dametto, a member of Katter's Australian Party defeated Cripps on a large swing which he consolidated at the 2020 election.

Members for Hinchinbrook

Election results

References

External links
 

Hinchinbrook